The EMD F3 is a   B-B freight- and passenger-hauling carbody diesel locomotive produced between July 1945 and February 1949 by General Motors’ Electro-Motive Division. Final assembly was at GM-EMD's La Grange, Illinois plant. A total of 1,111 cab-equipped lead A units and 696 cabless booster B units were built.

The F3 was the third model in GM-EMD's highly successful F-unit series of cab unit diesel locomotives, and it was the second most produced of the series. The F3 essentially differed from the EMD F2 in that it used the “new” D12 generator to produce more power and from the later EMD F7 in electrical equipment. Some late-model F3's had the same D27 traction motors, along with the heavier-duty electrical cables, used in the F7, and were referred to as model F5 by EMD's Engineering Department.

Engine and powertrain 
The F3 used a 16-cylinder 567B series diesel engine developing  at 800 rpm. A D.C. generator powered four traction motors, two on each Blomberg B truck. EMD has built all of its major components since 1939.

Identification 
As built, the only way to distinguish between the F2 and F3 was the nose number panels on the A units, which were small on the F2 and large on the F3 and subsequent locomotives. However, these could and were often altered by the railroad. Few F2s were built, however.

Early versions of the F3 had the "chicken wire" grilles along the top edge of the carbody. Later production featured a distinctive fabricated stainless steel grille.

All F-units introduced after the FT have twin exhaust stacks and four electrically powered radiator fans arranged close together atop their roofs, unlike the FT's four stacks and separated belt driven pairs of fans.

F3 phases 

The identification of locomotive "phases" is a creation of railfans. EMD used no such identification, and instead only kept track of the marketing name (e.g. F2, F3, F7, etc.) and individual locomotives' build (serial) numbers. During the production cycle of a particular model, as design and production techniques improved, all builders would invariably make minor changes. To better keep track of noticeable, and not so noticeable differences in appearance that a locomotive model would acquire during the course of its production run, locomotive historians began documenting any subtle or minor changes made to a particular diesel locomotive model as "phases", and referring to these as such. This practice has proved very popular over the years among diesel locomotive modelers looking to create the most "true to life" models possible.

Despite not being official designations, phase descriptions are quite useful to the diesel spotter and record keeper, but sometimes tricky as many of the changes described are mostly cosmetic and easily altered features of a locomotive - roof fans, body panels, grilles, etc. that could be - and often were - updated or swapped interchangeably during production runs.

The following are normally identified as F3 phases:

Phase I 
Built from July 1945. High, flat-topped 36 in (914 mm) roof fans. Top third body panel had "chicken wire" in openings only. Short rear vent panel. Center-third body panel with three equally-spaced porthole windows and D17 traction motors. As-built Phase I F3 units are identical to the F2, they differ only in electrical equipment and numberboard size. Three highly modified locomotives survive from this series, rebuilt as FP10s, all for Metro-North Railroad.

Phase II (early) 
Built from February 1947. Top third body panel now had full-length "chicken wire". Long rear vent panel. Center third body panel now had two portholes; area between covered with chicken wire, over 4 smaller rectangular openings.

Phase II (late) 
Built from December 1947. Roof radiator fans change to low, pancake fans.

Phase III 
Built from March 1948. (the former Bangor and Aroostook Railroad's F3's: 44 and 46, were rebuilt in preservation to resemble Phase 2 F3s) Center third body panel now has no chicken wire between the portholes; the four rectangular openings now have louvres.

Phase IV 
Built from August 1948. Chicken wire upper-third panel is replaced with full-length horizontal stainless steel grille.

"F5" 
The first "F5A" EMDX demonstrator #59 was built in March 1948. Production of the "F5" started in August 1948 through the end of F3 production in February 1949. The difference between the "F5" and the F3 were the D27 traction motors with heavier-duty cables and higher capacity traction motor blowers fitted. Nearly all previously built F3's received the same upgrades by 1955. A total of 381 F5As and 238 F5Bs were produced. The note in the January 1, 1959 EMD Service Department Locomotive Reference Data states, "All F5 locomotives were delivered as F3 units." All EMD DC traction motors are backwards compatible so as the better motors became available the D37, D47, D57, D67 and D77 all could be found on an F unit.

Original owners

Surviving examples 

Twelve F3s survive today at a variety of museums; ten being A units and two being B units.

Metro-North Railroad still had three FP10 units in service, which are rebuilt F3s, before BL20GHs took over. When ConnDOT leased GE P40DCs from Amtrak, their usage of in revenue service has declined. Those went to the Shore Line East when the BL20GHs took over. These units were originally built for the Gulf, Mobile and Ohio railroad and rebuilt by Illinois Central to FP10 status for MBTA. Metro North originally acquired four of the units, but one was acquired by the Adirondack Scenic Railway for service out of Utica, New York. Another was sent to the Danbury Railway Museum in 2019, while the other two have since been scrapped.

The Alberta Railway Museum in Edmonton, Alberta owns Canadian National F3 #9000. #9000 was the first diesel road freight locomotive ordered for a Canadian railway and one of the only six F3's to be owned by a Canadian Railway. #9000 was built in 1948 and was part of an order for six locomotives (two A-B-A sets).

Steamtown National Historic Site in Scranton, Pennsylvania is home to former Bangor and Aroostook F3s 44 (owned by the Tri-State chapter of the NRHS in Morristown, New Jersey) and 46 (owned by the Anthracite Railroads Historical Society). Both engines were initially restored as Jersey Central 56 and 57, but as of 2012 have been repainted as Lackawanna 663 and 664. These engines, along with BAR 42, are the oldest "chicken wire" style F3s in existence and are used on most long distance excursions from the park. The ARHS also owns a former Boston & Maine F7B (4268B), which has been altered to resemble a F3B. It is also currently located in Scranton, and as of May 2014 has been cosmetically restored as DL&W 664B, with mechanical restoration still to come.

The Montreal, Maine & Atlantic Railway, the corporate successor to BAR, owned #42, which was renumbered back to its original number, 502, when it was repainted into the original gray and yellow scheme.  After the Lac-Mégantic rail disaster and the subsequent bankruptcy and liquidation of the railway, this locomotive was purchased, along with most of the rest of the former railway's assets, by the Fortress Investment Group and formed into the Central Maine and Quebec Railway.

The Southern Appalachia Railway Museum owns Clinchfield Railroad F3A (upgraded to F7A) #800. In 2017, it was repainted to the classic CRR gray and yellow by CSX, and operated on the 2017 Santa Train and excursion trains in Orlando, FL  until leaving to move Chesapeake and Ohio 2716 from New Haven, KY to Ravenna, KY. It is now at SARM over one year after its acquisition by the museum. During the time the #800 was operated by CSX, it wore the railroad's then-current YN2 paint scheme.

There is a ex-Clinchfield Railroad F3B unit, originally numbered 852 and rebuilt to an F7B, stored at the Tennessee Valley Railroad Museum in Chattanooga, TN. This unit is best known for its use on the Haysi Railroad, in which it was equipped it with radio controls and a makeshift cab in 1972. It is owned by Vintage Locomotive Inc but is stored on the property, making it not likely to be restored by the TVRM.

In popular culture 
Since 1948, Lionel has made models of the F3 in many versions and paint schemes. The 1948 to 1949 Santa Fe F3 is arguably the most famous toy train ever made. The 2345 Lionel Western Pacific, in production for only one year, is the one of the rarest and most sought after variants of postwar Lionel F3 model train production.

References

Notes

Bibliography 

Burlington Route Historical Society. EMD model F3. Burlington Route Historical Society - Roster. Retrieved November 22, 2021, from http://www.burlingtonroute.org/Qrailroad/roster/F3_diesel_locomotives.php. 
 Burns, A. EMD "F3" Diesel Locomotives. American-Rails. Retrieved November 22, 2021, from https://www.american-rails.com/291a2.html. 
 
 Furhman, Jim. EMD F2-F3-F5 Phase Chart. Retrieved January 2, 2005
 
 
Monon Railroad Historical-Technical Society, Inc. Monon diesel-electric roster. Monon Railroad Historical-Technical Society, Inc. Retrieved November 22, 2021, from https://monon.org/documents/MononDieselRoster.pdf. 
 
 Rio Grande Modeling & Historical Society. DRGW F3 Roster. Rio Grande Modelling and Historical Society. Retrieved November 22, 2021, from https://www.rgmhs.org/data/diesels/f3.html. 
 Russell, Larry G. "The F5" Extra 2200 South #96 pages 19–22, and 28.
 
 
 
 
 
 
 
 The Diesel Shop. EMD F3A and F3B. EMC F3 data sheet. Retrieved November 22, 2021, from https://www.thedieselshop.us/Data%20EMD%20F3.HTML.

External links

B-B locomotives
F03
Diesel-electric locomotives of the United States
Railway locomotives introduced in 1945
Locomotives with cabless variants
Standard gauge locomotives of the United States
Passenger locomotives
Streamlined diesel locomotives